Vinodini Ramanbhai Nilkanth (9 February 1907 – 29 September 1987) was a Gujarati writer, translator, and academic. She wrote novels, essays, short stories, journalist columns, and children's literature.

Early life 

Vinodini Nilkanth was born in Ahmedabad, then part of the Bombay Presidency. Her father was Ramanbhai Nilkanth, a Gujarati novelist and politician. Her mother, Vidyagauri Nilkanth, was a social reformer and educator, and one of the first women in Gujarat to graduate from university. Both of her parents were writers, as well as her sister Sarojini.

Vinodini attended primary school at Mahalakshmi Training College. She went to secondary school at Government Girls High School. In 1928, she completed her Bachelor of Arts with English as her primary subject and Gujarati as a secondary language. In 1930, she went to University of Michigan to study for her Masters in Social Science and Education.

Career 
Vinodini Nilkanth  was chief of the Vanita Vishram, an institute in Ahmedabad. She was also the Headmistress of the Municipal Girls High School in Ahmedabad. Later she became a professor at the S. N. D. T Mahila Pathshala. She also wrote columns in newspapers. She was a member of the executive committee of the Gujarat Vidhya Sabha.

Works 

Nilkanth published her first book of essays in her teens. Her short stories revealed her penetration of the human mind, particular the mind of a woman.

Personal essays
 Rasadwara (1928)
 Nijananda

Short story collections
 Aarasini Bhitarma (1942)
 Karpasi ane Biji Vartao
 Dil Dariavna Moti (1958) 
 Angulino Sparsh (1965)

Novel
 Kadalivan

Children's literature
 Shishuranjana (1950)
 Mendini Manjari (1956)
 Balakoni Duniyama Dokiyu
 Safarachand (1964)
 Padchand Kathiyaro (1964)

Other writings
 Gharno Vahivat (1959)
 Bal Suraksha (1961)
 Muktajanoni Bhoomi (1966).

Translations
In addition to her own literary work, Nilkanth  translated  Jane Austen's Pride and Prejudice into Gujarat. She also published Sukhni Siddhi, a translation of Bertrand Russell's The Conquest of Happiness.

Journalistic writings
From 1949, she wrote a column Ghar Gharni Jyoti in a daily paper, Gujarat Samachar, which became very popular. Her journalistic writings as a columnist have been published in five volumes: Ghar Gharni Jyot part 1, 2, 3 & 4 (1955, 1958, 1964 & 1969). The last one, Ghar Diwdi, (1987) was published after her death.

Adaptation
Nilkanth's short story Dariyav Dil was adapted into Gujarati film Kashino Dikro (1979) directed by Kanti Madia.

Awards
Her short story collections Dil Dariavna Moti won the Gujarat Sahitya Sabha Award, and her work Angulino Sparsh won the Gujarat government award.

See also 
 List of Gujarati-language writers

References

External links 
 
 

1907 births
1987 deaths
Women writers from Gujarat
19th-century Indian women writers
19th-century Indian writers
20th-century Indian women writers
20th-century Indian writers
Writers from Ahmedabad
Gujarati-language writers
Nilkanth family
University of Michigan alumni